5 was the sixth studio album by Bosnian Serb singer Stoja. It was released in 2004.

Track listing
Starija (Older Woman)
Da isečeš vene (To Cut Your Veins)
Dijamanti (Diamonds)
Duplo piće (Double Drinks)
Do pola (In Half)
Govore mi tvoje oči (Your Eyes Tell Me)
Od splava do splava (From Raft to Raft)
Ne dam ti (I Won't Allow You)

References

2004 albums
Stoja albums
Grand Production albums